In enzymology, a 3β-hydroxy-5α-steroid dehydrogenase is an enzyme that catalyzes the chemical reaction

3β-hydroxy-5α-pregnane-20-one + NADP+  5α-pregnan-3,20-dione + NADPH + H+

Thus, the two substrates of this enzyme are 3β-hydroxy-5α-pregnane-20-one (allopregnanolone) and NADP+, whereas its 3 products are 5α-pregnan-3,20-dione, NADPH, and H+.

This enzyme belongs to the family of oxidoreductases, specifically those acting on the CH-OH group of donor with NAD+ or NADP+ as acceptor. The systematic name of this enzyme class is 3β-hydroxy-5α-steroid:NADP+ 3-oxidoreductase.

References

 
 

EC 1.1.1
NADPH-dependent enzymes
Enzymes of unknown structure